Kalafong Provincial Tertiary Hospital (also known as Kalafong Hospital) is a public hospital in Pretoria, Gauteng, South Africa. The hospital is situated on the western outskirts of Pretoria in the suburb of Atteridgeville. The University of Pretoria uses the hospital as a training institution for the Faculty of Health Sciences.

History
Construction commenced in 1965, with patient treatment commencing on 1 March 1972. On 9 March 1973 the Honourable Mr Sybrand van Niekerk, then Administrator of the Transvaal, officially opened the hospital.

Coat of arms
The hospital registered a coat of arms at the Bureau of Heraldry in 1980: Azure,  an  Ansate  cross Argent, charged on the shaft with a bee, Or.

References

Hospital buildings completed in 1973
Teaching hospitals in South Africa
Hospitals in Gauteng
Buildings and structures in Pretoria
University of Pretoria
20th-century architecture in South Africa